Excalibur is an assault rifle derived from the INSAS rifle, the standard rifle of the defence - and to a lesser extent the police - forces of India. The rifle has many improvements over the INSAS rifle and was slated to replace the INSAS as the Indian Army's standard assault rifle; however, the Indian Army put the replacement out to tender in September 2016. Many police forces have however procured variants of Excalibur in limited numbers.

The Excalibur is manufactured by the Ordnance Factories Board in Ordnance Factory Tiruchirappalli, Small Arms Factory, Kanpur and Ichapore Arsenal. Design of the assault rifle first started in 2004.

History
The Indian Army used the INSAS rifle from the late 1990s, and the rifle saw action during the Kargil War. The INSAS was said to be plagued with many reliability issues like cracking of the polymer magazines because of cold weather, oil being sprayed in the user's eyes and the rifle going into automatic mode when set on 3-round burst (the INSAS does not have an automatic mode).

In November 2011, the Indian Army sent a request for proposal (RFP) to 34 vendors for 65,678 multi-calibre rifles for about  crore ( million). The tender also included a license to manufacture about 100,000 more rifles in India, with a total expenditure of the phasing out estimated at  crore ( million). Similar tenders for a carbine and a LMG were also issued. However, the Army sent a letter to the manufacturers on 15 June 2015, to notify them that the tender had been retracted.

After cancelling the tender, the army decided to pursue the new Excalibur rifle developed by the ARDE as a replacement for the older INSAS rifles.

On 3 July 2016, the Indian media reported that the Indian Army had rejected the Excalibur for its standard issue assault rifle as it did not match the requirements standard of the army.

In September 2016 the Indian Army announced that it was launching a tender for 185,000 7.62×51mm-caliber assault rifles. The Indian Army in October 2016 announced that Excalibur rifles will be adopted as an interim assault rifle until a suitable replacement is found.

In June 2017, the Excalibur was announced to have failed tests due to concerns about quality control and ineffective firepower.

In July 2018, the Indian Army announced that plans to adopt the Excalibur will not proceed.

Trials
The Army tested the Excalibur in 2014–15. Some of the trials included:

 Firing the rifle after submerging it in water and mud for about half an hour
 User reliability trails
 Checking the number of stoppages after firing 24,000 rounds

Operators

Assam Police
Karnataka Police
Manipur Police
West Bengal Police
Uttar Pradesh Police

See also
 Amogh carbine
 Multi Caliber Individual Weapon System

References

External links
 

Weapons and ammunition introduced in 2017
5.56 mm assault rifles
Rifles of India